Organizations is a book by James G. March and Herbert A. Simon.

References

1958 books